The 2008 Kehoe Cup was an inter-county and colleges hurling competition in the province of Leinster. The competition is ranked below the Walsh Cup and features second and third tier counties from Leinster and Connacht and selected university teams. The winners were Meath who defeated Carlow 1–20 to 0–17 in the final.

Kehoe Cup

First round
All of the first round matches were originally due to take place in the week ending 13 January 2008.  However, due to poor weather and waterlogged pitches, three matches were postponed until the weekend of 20 January 2008.

Quarter-finals
The quarter finals saw Meath, Carlow, Wicklow and D.I.T progress to the semi finals.

Semi-finals

Final

References

Kehoe Cup
Kehoe Cup